Con Todo el Mundo is the second studio album by American musical trio Khruangbin. It was released January 26, 2018 under Dead Oceans and Night Time Stories.

Critical reception

Con Todo el Mundo was met with widespread acclaim reviews from critics. Erin MacLeod of Pitchfork reviewed "Con Todo el Mundo crafts a unique, psychedelic vibe that hangs between continents and eras."

Track listing

References

2018 albums
Khruangbin albums
Dead Oceans albums
Night Time Stories albums